Odostomia harveyi is a species of sea snail, a marine gastropod mollusc in the family Pyramidellidae, the pyrams and their allies.

Distribution
This species occurs in the following locations:
 European waters (ERMS scope) : North Atlantic Ocean.

References

External links
 To CLEMAM
 To Encyclopedia of Life
 To World Register of Marine Species

harveyi
Gastropods described in 1996